Labeo caeruleus is fish in genus Labeo from Pakistan.

References 
 

Labeo
Fish described in 1877